Alessandro Albanese (born 12 January 2000) is a Belgian professional footballer who plays as a winger for Challenger Pro League club Virton on loan from Oostende.

Club career
Albanese began playing football at the age of 3 at Herstal, and continued his football training in the academies of Standard Liège, Porto, Hoffenheim, and Eintracht Frankfurt. After a year without a club, Albanese signed a professional contract with Waasland-Beveren in the summer of 2020. Albanese made his professional debut with Waasland-Beveren in a 3-1 Belgian First Division A win over K.V. Kortrijk, assisting his side's first goal in the 10th minute.

On 4 January 2022, Albanese moved to Oostende and signed a contract until 2025. On 18 January 2023, he was loaned by Virton.

International career
Born in Belgium, Albanese is of Italian descent. He is a youth international for Belgium.

References

External links
 
 ACFF Profile

2000 births
Belgian people of Italian descent
People from Lier, Belgium
Footballers from Antwerp Province
Living people
Belgian footballers
Belgium youth international footballers
Association football wingers
S.K. Beveren players
K.V. Oostende players
R.E. Virton players
Belgian Pro League players
Challenger Pro League players
Belgian expatriate footballers
Expatriate footballers in Portugal
Belgian expatriate sportspeople in Portugal
Expatriate footballers in Germany
Belgian expatriate sportspeople in Germany